Bridewell is a common noun meaning jail, (now archaic,) a surname, and the proper name of a number of jails.  

Bridewell may also refer to:

Buildings
 Any prison in Britain or its English-speaking former colonies; especially
 Bridewell Palace, London; later a prison, the original "bridewell".
 a village lock-up
 Central Police Station, Bristol, originally a bridewell
 Bridewell Police Station, Nottingham, England
 Clerkenwell Bridewell, London
 Tothill Fields Bridewell, Westminster, London
 Wymondham Bridewell, Norfolk
 The Bridewell, Edinburgh, Scotland
 Bridewell (New York City jail)
 Bridewell the former city jail of Chicago
 Bridewell Garda Station, Cork
 Bridewell Garda Station, Dublin

People
 Ollie Bridewell (1985–2007) British motorcycle racer
 Tommy Bridewell (b.1988) British motorcycle racer

Other uses
The Bridewells aka The Bridewell Taxis, Leeds-based British indie rock group active from 1987 to 1993

See also
 Brideswell (disambiguation)